Demchok,
previously called New Demchok,
and called Parigas by the Chinese,
is a village and military encampment in the Indian-administered Demchok sector that is disputed between India and China. It is administered as part of the Nyoma tehsil in the Leh district of Ladakh by India, and claimed by China as part of the Tibet Autonomous Region.

The Line of Actual Control (LAC) passes along the southeast side of the village, along the Charding Nullah (also called Demchok River and Lhari stream) which joins the Indus River near the village. Across the stream, less than a kilometre away, is a Chinese-administered Demchok village.

Name 

The village of Demchok was apparently named after Demchok Karpo, the rocky white peak behind the present Ladakhi village of Demchok. However, prior to 1947, the main Demchok village was on the Tibetan side of the border. The Ladakhi side of the settlement was still referred to as "Demchok".

Chinese officials use the name "Demchok" only for the Tibetan side of the settlement and refer to the Ladakhi side as "Parigas" (also spelt "Barrigas").
This is apparently derived from a Tibetan name Palichasi, of a pastoral ground known to Ladakhis as Silungle, roughly halfway downstream to Lagankhel.

Geography 

A stream called  Charding Nullah (or Lhari stream) flows down on the southeast side of Demchok joining the Indus River. The alluvial deposits from the stream form small plots for grazing and farming. Around the corner of the peak is a hot spring, whose water is believed to have medicinal qualities.

The Line of Actual Control (LAC) with Tibet runs on the southeast side of the village along the Charding Nullah. Across the stream, 600 metres away, is the Tibetan Demchok village.  After reaching the Indus River, the LAC follows its right bank, according Indian explorer Romesh Bhattacharji. leaving the left bank of Indus under Indian control. The Chinese still retain a claim to the Indian part of the disputed Demchok sector and object to any construction there.
Along the left bank of the Indus River, numerous streams flow down from the ridge line in the west to the Indus, providing grazing grounds and campsites to the Changpa nomads. The largest of these is the site of Lagankhel (La Ganskyil), which is historically regarded as a village with permanent settlement. Some of these locations are now said to host posts of Indo-Tibetan Border Police as does the Demchok village itself.

An old travel route from Ladakh to Tibet, leading to Kailas–Manasarowar, runs along the left bank of the Indus River. The route has been closed since the emergence of Sino-Indian border disputes. There have been persistent demands from the local population to reopen it.

History 

Demchok is a historic area of Ladakh, having been part of the kingdom from its inception in the 10th century. The description of the kingdom in the Ladakh Chronicles mentions Demchok Karpo, also called Demchok Lhari Karpo or Lhari Karpo, as part of the original kingdom. This is a possible reference to the rocky white peak behind the present-day Demchok village.

The Lhari peak is held sacred by Buddhists. Demchok is the name of a Buddhist Tantric deity, who is believed to reside on the Mount Kailas, and whose imagery parallels that of Shiva in Hinduism.
The Lhari peak is also referred to as "Chota Kailas" (mini Kailas) and attracts both Hindu and  Buddhists pilgrims.
Tibetologist Nirmal C. Sinha states that Demchok is part of the Hemis complex.
Ruined houses belonging to the Hemis monastery were noticed by Sven Hedin in 1907, and the monastery continues to own land in Demchok.

The stream that flows beside the Lhari peak, referred to as the Lhari stream in historical documents ("Charding Nullah" or "Demchok River" in modern times), was set as the boundary between Ladakh and Tibet at the end of the Tibet–Ladakh–Mughal War in the 17th century.

Dogra rule 

In 1834, the Dogra general Zorawar Singh conquered Ladakh and made it a tributary of the Sikh Empire. Zorawar Singh is said to have built a fort on a hill next to the Tibetan side of Demchok. He also launched an invasion of Tibet via three wings, one of which passed through Demchok. The invasion was eventually repulsed. The two sides agreed to retain the borders as they were before.

The Dogras came under the suzerainty of British Raj in 1846, as the state of Jammu and Kashmir. Henry Strachey visited the Demchok area in 1847, as part of a British boundary commission. He described Demchok as a "hamlet divided by a rivulet [the Lhari stream]", with settlements on both the sides of the stream. The stream was the prevailing border between Ladakh and Tibet.
The Tibetans did not allow Strachey to proceed beyond the stream.

The hamlet on the Ladakhi side of the Lhari stream appears to have been minimal. Strachey's own map published in the JRGS showed a village only on the Tibetan side of the stream. The map drawn by a Tibetan lama from the same period showed the same.

Sven Hedin, travelling through the area in 1907, noticed only ruins of houses on the Ladakhi side, formerly belonging to the Hemis monastery.
According to the governor of Ladakh (wazir-e-wazarat), who visited the area in 1904–05, there were two 'zaminders' (landhoders) on the Ladakhi side, viz., the representatives of the Hemis monastery and the former kardar (tax collector) of Rupshu.
The two appear to have lived in Demchok from around 1921, in a single building.

According to the Indian government, the Ladakhi Demchok village was used for seasonal cultivation by nomadic farmers.

Independent India 

The princely state of Jammu and Kashmir acceded to independent India on 26–27 October 1947.

In 1950, Tibet was annexed by China. The Indian government developed concerns of security and decided not to allow the entry of Tibetans into Ladakh. A border police post was established at Demchok (presumably on the Ladakhi side), with a police contingent headed by an inspector and equipped with wireless communication. In Chinese perception, this amounted to the Indian Army "invading" Demchok.

During the negotiations for the 1954 Trade Agreement, India asked for Ladakh's trade relations with Rudok and Rawang to be reinstated. China did not agree. However, it was happy to allow trade via "Demchok" and Tashigang. In fact, it offered to provide a "trade mart" in Demchok, which was not agreeable to India because India regarded Demchok as its own territory. The final agreement carried the wording, "the customary route leading to Tashigong along the valley of the Indus River may continue to be traversed."

In 1954, India defined its borders with respect to Tibet, which ran five miles southeast of Ladakhi Demchok. This made the Tibetan Demchok village part of Indian-claimed territory. In October 1955, the Chinese established the Border Working Group in the Tibetan Demchok village.

During the 1962 Sino-Indian War, the Chinese forces reclaimed the areas southeast of the Lhari stream. The Line of Actual Control resulting from the war runs along the Lhari stream.

Demographics 
According to the 2011 Census of India, Demchok had 31 households and a population of 78. The majority of the inhabitants are Changpa nomadic pastoralist. The effective literacy rate is 42.47%.

There is persistent talk of the nomads losing their customary grazing lands to Chinese occupation and their livelihoods being lost. The population is seen to be reducing as a result.

Sino-Indian disputes 

As of 2005, the route from Demchok to Lake Manasarovar in Tibet was closed and local trade with China was prohibited, although local residents admit that clandestine trade with China had been ongoing for decades.

In April 2016, the Daily Excelsior reported that local discontent over Chinese army objections near the border resulted in demands for resettlement from Demchok. Later in 2016, the Nubra constituency MLA Deldan Namgyal reported that the Chinese military suggested to the sarpanch of Demchok "to join China rather than [sit] with India" due to the infrastructural differences across the border. Demchok residents protested after the Indian Army refused permission for the local residents to build irrigation canals, to avoid a reaction from Chinese army.

In 2019, the sarpanch of Demchok said that residents of Demchok were moving to the town of Leh due to a lack of infrastructure and jobs.

Infrastructure

Transportation 

Chushul-Dungti-Fukche-Demchok highway (CDFD road), once a dirt track along the southern bank of the Indus river, is scheduled to be converted to a single-lane national highway by 2025. This has been a traditional route between Demchok and Chushul, which connects Demchok to Koyul, Dungti, Chushul and beyond to Durbuk and Leh. The road was in poor condition in 2017 and attempts to improve the road met with objections from China in 2009. After repeated incursions by China since 2013, in March 2016 the Government of Jammu and Kashmir approved the upgrade of this road. Since the road passes through the Changthang Wildlife Sanctuary, the subsequent approval by India's National Board for Wildlife in March 2017 paved the way for the upgrade of this road.

This road connects Demchok to Koyul, Hanle and other places in Ladakh. The Border Roads Organisation  claims it is the "world's highest motorable road", a title  earlier, incorrectly, accorded to Khardung La road at 17,600 ft.

Hanle-Fukche-Koyul-Demchok Road (HFKD Road) was constructed by BRO, which runs via Koyul.

Mobile and internet connectivity 
In June 2020, it was announced that Demchok is among 54 villages in the Ladakh region to receive mobile phone and internet connectivity via satellite under the Universal Service Obligation Funding. The service is to be operated by Jio.

See also 
 Fukche
 India-China Border Roads
 Chumar

Notes

References

Bibliography 
 
 Indian Report: ; ; ; 
 Chinese report: ; ; ;

Further reading 
 R. N. Ravi, Indifferent India allows Chinese land grab on the border, Rediff, 20 December 2013.

External links 
 Demchok Western Sector (Chinese claim), OpenStreetMap
 Demchok Eastern Sector (Indian claim), OpenStreetMap

Villages in Nyoma tehsil
Divided cities
Military installations of India
Demchok sector